Samurai Girl is a series of six novels by author Carrie Asai. It tells the story of Heaven Kogo, who as a baby was the lone survivor of a plane crash and was adopted by the wealthy Kogo family. At age nineteen, she is arranged to marry Teddy Yukemura, but her wedding is crashed by a ninja that kills her brother. She escapes to find out her lavish life and family isn't what she thought it was and must train under her brother's friend, Hiro, the ways of the samurai to protect herself and loved ones.

On September 5, 2008, ABC Family aired a six-hour mini-series based on the series. It starred Jamie Chung, Brendan Fehr, and Stacy Keibler

Besides Heaven's perspective in the story, the books include illustrations, newspaper reports, and other characters' entries. The back covers of the books include the same short description for the series, followed by another description for the specific book.

Characters 
 Heaven Kogo
 Ohiko Kogo
 Konishi Kogo
 Mieko Kogo
 Takeda "Teddy" Yukemura
 Hiro Uyemoto
 Karen
 Cheryl
 Jake
 Otto
 And many more characters

The Series

See also 
 Samurai Girl (2008 film)

References

External links 
 Samurai Girl- Publisher's website.

Series of children's books
Young adult novel series
American young adult novels